Top Country Albums is a chart that ranks the top-performing country music albums in the United States, published by Billboard.  In 1994, 10 different albums topped the chart, based on electronic point of sale data provided by SoundScan Inc.

In the issue of Billboard dated January 1, the number one position was held by the compilation album Common Thread: The Songs of the Eagles, its ninth week in the top spot.  The album, which featured various country music artists performing songs originally recorded by the Eagles, spent five non-consecutive weeks at number one in 1994, interrupted for a single week by Reba McEntire's album Greatest Hits Volume Two.  A second compilation album topped the chart in March and April, when Rhythm, Country and Blues, consisting of duets between R&B and country artists, spent two weeks in the top spot.  Several artists performed on both albums, including Travis Tritt, Vince Gill, and Trisha Yearwood, none of whom had topped the chart with any of their own albums to date.

In February, John Michael Montgomery achieved his first number one with Kickin' It Up, which spent six weeks in the top spot.  The album also topped the all-genre Billboard 200 listing.  Two months later, Tim McGraw achieved a similar feat by topping the country albums chart for the first time with an album which also reached number one on the Billboard 200.  McGraw's album Not a Moment Too Soon spent an initial 15 weeks at number one on the country chart, was displaced for a single week, then returned to the top spot for a further 11 weeks.  It returned to the top of the chart in December for a further three weeks to give a final total of 29 weeks atop the chart; only five previous albums had spent longer atop the chart.  The best-selling country album of the year, Not a Moment Too Soon launched McGraw to stardom; in the second half of the 1990s he was the most successful artist in country music and achieved mainstream celebrity.  Two other acts reached number one for the first time in the latter half of the year.  In the issue of Billboard dated October 15, Brooks & Dunn topped the chart for the first time with Waitin' on Sundown, and the following week Mary Chapin Carpenter gained the only number one of her career with Stones in the Road.  The year's final chart-topper was The Hits by Garth Brooks.

Chart history

References

1994
1994 record charts